Manteau is a word of French origin meaning cloak, gown or overcoat.

Manteau may refer to:
 Angèle Manteau (1911–2008), Belgian publisher
 Manteau (publisher), a Belgian imprint

See also 
 Manto (disambiguation)
 Sous le Manteau, a 1948 French documentary filmed in Austria